is a Japanese original anime television series produced by P.A. Works. The series is directed by Masahiro Andō and premiered from July 12 to September 27, 2018.

Plot
In 1930, a group of Vampires leave China and flee to Japan. They are followed by a group of vampire hunters called "Jaegers" under the cover of being staff of the "V Shipping Company". Among them is a young "Sirius" man called Yuliy, a werewolf whose home village was destroyed by "Vampires". In the past, a member of the Sirius royal family was chosen by oracle to be the agent of God and permitted to possess a mysterious holy relic known as "The Ark of Sirius" which, as a gift from God, could exert power over all things. Because of its potential the Sirius people came under attack from groups seeking its power so it was sealed away in a secret location, never to be used again. Yuliy and the Jaegers engage in a deadly battle with the Vampires for possession of the relic.

Characters

Jaegers
Jaegers are vampire hunters who use the cover of the "V Shipping Company" for their operations.

The main character. A 17-year-old Sirius werewolf and member of the Jaegers. He is the son of the Sirius Alexei and a human woman, Sachi, and has an older brother Mikhail. He is normally calm, but is ruthless when fighting vampires because they destroyed his home village of Dogville and wiped out its inhabitants. He wields a three-section staff with retractable blades at each end. He has black hair with a white streak and a short ponytail and sometimes his eyes glow bright blue.

An ex-Archeologist and Commander of the V Companies "Jaegers". In the past he deciphered an ancient book recovered from the ruins of the Sirius civilization and traced the Ark of Sirius to Dogville, leading to its destruction when the Vampires tried to find the Ark. He has white hair and wears a monocle over one eye. He is 41 years old.

Willard's right-hand woman and firearms expert. She is Spanish and 27 years old. She has black hair, tan skin, and green eyes.

A 14-year-old British boy of the Jaegers. He has blond hair and a hatred for the Sirius because a werewolf killed his parents.

A 26-year-old member of the Jaegers. He is a tall and bulky Irishman with waist length red hair and a good-natured personality.

Vampires
The Vampires operate under the cover of the Alma Corporation and seek the "Ark of Sirius" to possibly cure a degenerative disease which is killing them. Vampires are either Royals who can use their powers while still in human form, or former humans called Slaves who must transform into beasts to access their powers.

Yevgraf

He is a Royal Vampire and king of the Vampire Clan. He is leading the search for the "Ark of Sirius" for his own purposes.

Kershner

The second highest ranking Vampire with great ambitions. He has blond hair and wields a long thin sword.

Agatha

A female Vampire who has been drinking the blood of young men for 140 years to stay young. She has dark hair cut into a bob and grey eyes that glow red.

Larissa and Tamara

Larissa and Tamara are ruthless twin vampires. Larissa dies after Bishop catches up to her, as she's escaping, and shoots her. Tamara joins Yulily on his journey.

Mikhail Jirov

He is the older brother of Yuliy and became a vampire after being bitten by Yevgraf while defending his brother. He is a maverick within the Vampire clan and he is used by Yevgraf in his search for the "Arc of Sirius". He has white hair, grey eyes and a scarred face.

Others
Jiro Akimoto

The owner of a bar and an agent of the V Company. He has straight black hair in a ponytail.

Baron Naoe

He is the father of Ryoko and provides a base for the Jaegers in Japan.

Ryoko Naoe

The young daughter of Baron Naoe who develops an interest in Yuliy and assists the Jaegers. Although shy, she has trained in kenjutsu and is a competent swordswoman and carries a Katana.

Hideomi Iba

A Major in the Imperial Army who is investigating the murders committed by Vampires. He works undercover as a reporter for the Monthly Competent Crimes.

Kakizaki

Chief of the Japanese army's Weapons Department. He commits suicide after mistakenly becoming involved in the Alma company's test of the Alma Company's artificial humanoid weapon and losing a battalion of infantrymen.

Mamoru Akasaka

A hermit living near Sakhalin, at the site of the former Sirius civilization. 15 years earlier he was sent by the Japanese army to find and acquire the Ark of Sirius, but disappeared.

Bishop 

A former Jaeger, now working for the British government. He was bitten and became a Vampire, but seeks vengeance against the Vampires for killing his comrades.

Klarwein

A scientist allied with the Vampires. Part of his face and scalp is missing and he is obsessed with creating artificial life. He created an artificial humanoid weapon from human body parts for the Alma Corporation.

Momosei Naotora

Leader of the Hyakko Party who wear masks and target war profiteers, wealthy people and academics. He assisted the Vampires to gather the material they needed to create artificial humanoid weapon.

Production and release
The anime premiered from July 12 to September 27, 2018, and is broadcast on AT-X, Tokyo MX, BS11, and Tulip TV. The original character designs are provided by Kinu Nishimura, and Mai Matsuura and Souichirou Sako are adapting the designs for animation, as well as serving as chief animation directors for the series. Music for the series is composed by Masaru Yokoyama. Infinite produced the anime.

Shiho Takeuchi is in charge of the series' concept design. Masahiro Sato is the action animation director, Junichi Higashi and Ayumi Satō are the art directors, and Kazuto Izumida is the director of photography. The series is edited by Ayumu Takahashi. Mika Sugawara is in charge of the color setting, and Tariki Kiritani serves as the series 3D animation director. Jin Aketagawa is the sound director for the series.

Licensed by Netflix, the anime was made available on the streaming service on December 21, 2018.

Notes

References

External links
  at Netflix
  
 

2018 anime television series debuts
Action anime and manga
Anime and manga about werewolves
Anime with original screenplays
Japanese-language Netflix original programming
Netflix original anime
P.A.Works
Thriller anime and manga
Vampires in anime and manga